The 36th Intelligence Squadron is an active non-flying squadron, of the United States Air Force. It is assigned to the Air Force Targeting Center at Langley Air Force Base, Virginia, where it has been stationed since 1990. The squadron has earned the Air Force Meritorious Unit Award, the Air Force Outstanding Unit Award, and the Air Force Organizational Excellence Award while stationed at Langley.

During World War II the squadron served in the Pacific as the 36th Photographic Reconnaissance Squadron  The squadron earned the Philippine Presidential Unit Citation for its combat operations during the Liberation of the Philippines in 1944–1945.

History

World War II
The squadron was first activated in the summer of 1942 as the 28th Observation Squadron, one of the squadrons of the 73d Observation Group at Godman Field, Kentucky, where it was equipped with the Bell P-39 Airacobra. The squadron engaged in training activities including the Tennessee maneuvers of 1943.

During World War II, the squadron operated primarily in the Southwest Pacific Theater, providing aerial reconnaissance and intelligence information over a wide area of the theater in numerous campaigns. In 1945, it performed reconnaissance missions over Formosa as well as the Philippines. The squadron earned the Philippine Presidential Unit Citation for its combat operations during the Liberation of the Philippines in 1944–1945.  Following the Japanese surrender the squadron moved to Japan, briefly serving as part of the occupation forces, but returned to the Philippines at the end of 1945 and was inactivated in 1946.

Intelligence
The squadron was reactivated as an intelligence unit supporting Tactical Air Command (TAC) in 1990.  When Air Combat Command replaced TAC in 1992, the 36th was transferred along with its parent group. In February 2008, it was reassigned to the Air Combat Command Targeting and Intelligence Group.  Although much of its history remains classified, it has won numerous awards for its performance.

Lineage
 Constituted as the 28th Observation Squadron on 1 July 1942
 Activated on 17 July 1942
 Redesignated: 28th Reconnaissance Squadron (Fighter) on 2 April 1943
 Redesignated: 28th Tactical Reconnaissance Squadron on 11 August 1943
 Redesignated: 36th Photographic Mapping Squadron on 9 October 1943
 Redesignated: 36th Photographic Reconnaissance Squadron on 29 March 1944
 Inactivated on 20 February 1946
 Redesignated 36th Tactical Intelligence Squadron and activated on 1 September 1990
 Redesignated 36th Air Intelligence Squadron on 1 November 1991
 Redesignated 36th Intelligence Squadron on 1 October 1993

Assignments

 73d Observation (later Reconnaissance; Tactical Reconnaissance) Group, 17 July 1942
 76th Tactical Reconnaissance Group, 9 October 1943 (attached to 73d Tactical Reconnaissance Group)
 74th Tactical Reconnaissance Group, 21 October 1943 (attached to 73d Tactical Reconnaissance Group to 3 November 1943)
 I (later III) Tactical Air Division, 29 March 1944
 Far East Air Forces, November 1944
 Thirteenth Air Force, 2 December 1944
 Fifth Air Force, 7 December 1944

 6th Photographic (later Reconnaissance) Group, 23 December 1944
 Seventh Air Force, 20 October 1945
 V Fighter Command, 29 November 1945
 Far East Air Forces (later Pacific Air Command, US Army), 3 December 1945 – 20 February 1946
 480th Tactical Intelligence Group (later 480th Air Intelligence Group, 480th Intelligence Group), 1 September 1990
 Air Combat Command Targeting and Intelligence Group (later Air Force Targeting Center), 2 June 2008 – present

Stations

 Godman Field, Kentucky, 17 July 1942
 Camp Campbell Army Airfield, Kentucky, 25 June 1943
 Muskogee Army Air Field Oklahoma, to April-31 October 1944
 Hollandia Airfield Complex, Netherlands East Indies, 15 December 1944
 Mokmer Airfield, Biak, Netherlands East Indies, 26 December 1944

 Clark Field, Luzon, Philippines, c. 28 April – 26 July 1945
 Motobu Airfield, Okinawa, 4 August 1945 (air echelon remained at Clark Field to September 1945)
 Chofu Airport, Japan, October 1945
 Fort William McKinley, Luzon, Philippines, December 1945 – 20 February 1946
 Langley AFB, Virginia, 1 September 1990 – Present

Aircraft

Attack and Bomber Aircraft
 Douglas A-20 Havoc and DB-7, 1942–1944
 Lockheed A-29 Hudson during period 1942 – 1944
 North American B-25 Mitchell, 1943–1944
 Lockheed B-34 Ventura, during period 1942 – 1944

Fighter Aircraft
 Lockheed P-38 Lightning (F-5), 1944, 1945.
 Bell P-39 Airacobra: 1942–1943, 1943, 1943–1944
 Republic P-43 Lancer during period 1942 – 1944
 North American P-51 Mustang during period 1942 – 1944

Observation and Liaison Aircraft
 Stinson L-1 Vigilant, during period 1942 – 1944
 Taylorcraft L-2, during period 1942 – 1944
 Piper L-4 Cub, during period 1942 – 1944
 North American O-47, during period 1942 – 1944
 Curtiss O-52 Owl, during period 1942 – 1944

Awards and Campaigns

Manual campaign table

References

Notes

Bibliography

External links

036